Vilayati Babu, also spelled Walayati Babu, is a 1981 Punjabi film directed by Dharam Kumar, starring Mehar Mittal, Reena Roy, Nasir Hussain, Ved Goswami, Yogesh Chhabda with a special appearance of Amitabh Bachchan.

Cast

References

External links 

1981 films
Films set in Punjab, India
Punjabi-language Indian films
1980s Punjabi-language films